Stenoma annosa is a moth in the family Depressariidae. It was described by Arthur Gardiner Butler in 1877. It is found in the Brazilian states of Pará and Amazonas.

References

Moths described in 1877
Stenoma